On 5 July 2015, major attacks occurred in Nigeria - in Potiskum, Jos and Borno.

Just before 10am on 5 July 2015, in Potiskum, Yobe State, a suicide bombing occurred at an evangelical church, the Redeemed Christian Church of God. It killed six people, including the bomber.

In the evening of the same day in Jos, Plateau State, a bomb that had been planted in a restaurant exploded, killing 23 people. During the same evening in the same city, a suicide bombing occurred at a mosque, killing 21 people.

On the same day in Borno State, a group of insurgents killed 9 villagers as well as burned down 32 churches and about 300 homes.

References

5 July attacks
2010s in Borno State
2010s in Yobe State
5 July 2015 attacks
21st century in Jos
5 July 2015 attacks
Arson in the 2010s
Attacks on buildings and structures in 2015
Attacks on churches in Africa
5 July 2015
Attacks on restaurants in Africa
Boko Haram suicide bombings
5 July 2015 attacks
Crime in Jos
Islamic terrorist incidents in 2015
Church bombings by Islamists
July 2015 crimes in Africa
July 2015 events in Nigeria
Mass murder in 2015
Mass murder in Borno State
Mass murder in Yobe State
Massacres perpetrated by Boko Haram
Boko Haram mosque bombings
Potiskum
Suicide bombings in 2015
5 July 2015 attacks
Terrorist incidents in Borno State
5 July attacks
Terrorist incidents in Yobe State